Dale William Stewart (born 30 November 1979) is a South African musician, best known as the bass guitarist for the South African rock band Seether.

Equipment
Stewart is sponsored by Schecter and has a signature model, the Dale Stewart Avenger  and Hartke amps.

Discography

Seether

Studio albums
Fragile (as Saron Gas)

References

1979 births
Living people
South African people of British descent
Seether members
21st-century South African male singers